Littorinoidea are a superfamily of both sea snails and land snails which have a gill and an operculum, terrestrial and marine gastropod mollusks in the clade Littorinimorpha.

The terrestrial family within this group, the Pomatiidae, are sometimes called "land winkles" because the group originated in the sea and the closely related family Littorinidae are known as "winkles".

Taxonomy
These families and subfamilies have been recognized in the taxonomy of Bouchet & Rocroi (2005):
 Littorinidae Children, 1834 - the periwinkles
Subfamily Littorininae Children, 1834
Subfamily Lacuninae Gray, 1857
Subfamily Laevilitorininae Reid, 1989
 † Bohaispiridae Youluo, 1978
 Pickworthiidae Iredale, 1917
 Subfamily Pickworthiinae Iredale, 1917 (synonym: Reynellonidae Iredale, 1917)
 Subfamily Pelycidiinae Ponder & Hall, 1983
 Subfamily Sherborniinae Iredale, 1917
 Pomatiidae Newton, 1891 (1828)
 Subfamily Pomatiinae Newton, 1891
 Annulariidae Henderson & Bartsch, 1920 
 Subfamily Annulariinae Henderson & Bartsch, 1920
Subfamily Rhytidopomatinae Henderson & Bartsch, 1920
Subfamily Tudorinae Watters, 2006
 † Purpurinidae Zittel, 1895
 Skeneopsidae Iredale, 1915
 † Tripartellidae Gründel, 2001
 Zerotulidae Warén & Hain, 1996

(Extinct taxa are indicated by a dagger, †.)
Families brought into synonymy
 Bembiciidae: synonym of Lacuninae
 Cyclostomatidae: synonym of Pomatiidae
 Ericiidae: synonym of Pomatiidae
 Faxiidae: synonym of Sherborniinae
 Lacunidae: synonym of Littorinidae
 Melarhaphidae: synonym of Littorininae
 Reynellonidae: synonym of Pickworthiinae
 Risellidae: synonym of Lacuninae

References

Littorinimorpha
Gastropod superfamilies
Taxa named by John George Children